Shaikha Ali Salem Al Maskari (born 1939) is an Emirati geophysicist, businesswoman and the chairperson of Al Maskari Holding.

Early life and education 
Al Maskari was born in Al Ain in the United Arab Emirates. She earned a bachelor's degree from the University of London, and a Ph.D. in geology from Indiana University.

Career 
Al Maskari began her career at Abu Dhabi National Oil Company (ADNOC) in 1974. Her job involved reviewing and reporting on the studies and surveys of the oil and gas fields. She left the company in 1989 and joined her family petroleum company Al Maskaria Establishment, which was founded by her mother Sheikha Azza Bint Saif Al Maskari and in 2008 was reorganized into Al Maskari Holding.

Awards and recognition 
In 2016, she received Sweden's Royal Order of the Polar Star, First Class for building bridges between Sweden and the United Arab Emirates in the form of organizing exchange programs for Emirati medical students with the University of Gothenburg in the late 1980.

In 2018, she was listed at Forbes list of the 100 most influential women in the Middle East at number 70.

Philanthropy
Al Maskari is a philanthropist through her private foundation and in coordination with Emirates Red Crescent.

Personal life
Al Maskari was married to Donald Henry Hase, a geology professor at the University of Iowa, and they had three children together. Her husband passed away in 1990.

References 

Living people
1939 births
Emirati women in business
Indiana University alumni
Alumni of the University of London